Nyamuragira, also known as Nyamulagira, is an active shield volcano in the Virunga Mountains of the Democratic Republic of the Congo, situated about  north of Lake Kivu. The name is derived from the Bantu verb Kuragira nyamu, meaning to herd animals; nyamu means animal or cows.

It has been described as Africa's most active volcano and has erupted over 40 times since 1885.  As well as eruptions from the summit, there have been numerous eruptions from the flanks of the volcano, creating new smaller volcanoes that have lasted only for a short time (e.g. Murara from late 1976 to 1977).

Recent eruptions occurred on 2 January 2010, 8 November 2011 and 23 May 2021.

Geography and geology
It is in the Nord-Kivu Province.

It has a low shield profile and contrasts with adjacent steep-sided Nyiragongo volcano.

Nyamuragira volcano is responsible for a large portion of the sulfur dioxide released into the atmosphere by volcanoes.

Recent activity

2010 eruption
At dawn on 2 January 2010 Nyamuragira began spewing out lava flows. There are no settlements close to the volcano, but wildlife officials feared that the eruption may threaten the chimpanzees in the area. Another danger was that the lava could have flowed into the southern sector of Virunga National Park, where there are settlements and villages.

2011 eruption
The volcano erupted again on 5 November 2011.

2014 lava lake

In 2014, a new lava lake appeared at the volcano for the first time in 75 years. The previous lava lake at the volcano was emptied in the 1938 lava flow. The formation of the new lake occurred between June and August 2014. It reached a depth of }. The eruption did not affect the communities in the area but left a lot of ash and air pollution. Sulfate aerosols formed by volcanic sulfur dioxide from the eruptions were observed as far away as over the central Amazon rain forest in South America. By 2018, the lava lake had hardened and the activity appeared to have stopped. Eruptive activity continues during 2021 at the summit caldera.

2021 lava lake
In 2021, a lava lake appeared at the volcano based on a June 11 satellite image.

See also
 List of volcanoes in the Democratic Republic of the Congo

References

External links

 Nyamuragira Volcano
 Smithsonian Institution's Global Volcanism Program: Nyamuragira
 2006 eruption
 "Congo volcano threat to villages"  BBC report with video, 2010 eruption
 "Nyamuragira volcano - VolcanoDiscovery" Information, news, videos and photos from the 2011-2012 eruption
 VolcanoDiscovery news

Polygenetic shield volcanoes
Active volcanoes
Virunga Mountains
Volcanoes of the Great Rift Valley
Mountains of the Democratic Republic of the Congo
Volcanoes of the Democratic Republic of the Congo
Lake Kivu